Sclerotinia ricini is a plant pathogen infecting poinsettias.

References

External links 
 Index Fungorum
 USDA ARS Fungal Database

Fungal plant pathogens and diseases
Ornamental plant pathogens and diseases
Sclerotiniaceae
Fungi described in 1919